Annavasal is a village in the Kudavasal taluk of Tiruvarur district, Tamil Nadu, India.

Demographics 

 census, Annavasal  had a total population of 682 with 342 males and 340 females. The sex ratio was 994. The literacy rate was 71.14.

References 

 

Villages in Tiruvarur district